Ishaara  (इशारा "gesture") is a 1943 Indian Bollywood film by J.K. Nanda. It was the tenth highest grossing Indian film of 1943.

Cast
 Prithviraj Kapoor and Suraiya

References

External links
 

1943 films
1940s Hindi-language films
Indian black-and-white films